is the 18th studio album by Japanese singer-songwriter Miyuki Nakajima, released in June 1990. The album includes remix version of "Ashita", a top-20 charting smash hit single released in 1989 and certified gold by the RIAJ. After two months from release of the album, "with" was released as a single. The song was featured in the 1991 film My Sons, directed by Yoji Yamada.

Mixing of Yoru o Yuke was taken at The Manor Studio in the United Kingdom. Part of the album was recorded additionally at the studio in Britain, and some of the songs featured saxophone played by Mel Collins.

Track listing
All songs written and composed by Miyuki Nakajima.
"" – 5:37
"" – 5:30
"" – 4:41
"" [album mix] – 5:30
"" – 6:33
"" – 4:19
"" – 6:43
"" – 6:27
"" – 5:04
 "with" – 5:39

Personnel
Jun Aoyama – drums
Hideo Yamaki – drums
Tōru Hasebe – drums
Toshiaki Usui – acoustic guitar
Chūei Yoshikawa – acoustic guitar, mandolin, mandola
Tsuyoshi Kon – acoustic guitar, electric guitar
Masaki Matsubara – electric guitar, gut guitar
Takayuki Hijikata – electric guitar 
Yasuo Tomikura – bass guitar
Hideki Matsubara – bass guitar
Chiharu Mikuzuki – bass guitar, fretless bass, stickbass
Yasuharu Nakanishi – keyboards
Ryoichi Kuniyoshi – keyboards
Nobuo Kurata – keyboards, computer programming
Keishi Urata – computer programming
Ichizo Seo – computer programming, keyboards, backup vocals
Kazuyo Sugimoto – backup vocals
Yuiko Tsubokura – backup vocals
Mel Collins – saxophone
Toshihiko Furumura – saxophone

Production
Producer and Arranger: Ichizo Seo
Composer, Lyricist, Producer and Performer: Miyuki Nakajima
Recording Engineer – Jun Amatatu, Takanobu Ichikawa, Chizuru Yamada, Katsuyoshi Yahagi, Kenji Matsunaga, Kengo Kato, Yoshiyuki Yokoyama, Calum Rees
Mixer – Felix Kendall (at the Manor Studio, Oxford, UK)
Mastering Engineer – Bunt Stafford Clark (at the Town House Studio, London)
Photographer and Art Director: Jin Tamura
Designer: Hirofumi Arai
Costume: Kazumi Yamase
Hair and Makeup – Harumi Kohno
A&R: Yūzō Watanabe, Kazuhiro Nagaoka
Disc Promotor: Yoshio Kan, Hiroshi Akao
Music Coordinator – Takashi Kimura, Fumio Miyata
Artist Management: Kohji Suzuki
General Management: Takahiro Uno
Management Desk: Atsuko Hayashi, Tomoko Takaya
DAD – Genichi Kawakami
Thank to the Manor Studio Staff

Chart positions

Miyuki Nakajima albums
1990 albums
Pony Canyon albums